A caldarium (also called a calidarium, cella caldaria or cella coctilium) was a room with a hot plunge bath, used in a Roman bath complex.

This was a very hot and steamy room heated by a hypocaust, an underfloor heating system using tunnels with hot air, heated by a furnace tended by slaves. This was the hottest room in the regular sequence of bathing rooms; after the caldarium, bathers would progress back through the Tepidarium to the Frigidarium.

In the caldarium, there would be a bath (alveus, piscina calida or solium) of hot water sunk into the floor and there was sometimes even a laconicum—a hot, dry area for inducing sweating.

The bath's patrons would use olive oil to cleanse themselves by applying it to their bodies and using a strigil to remove the excess. This was sometimes left on the floor for the slaves to pick up or put back in the pot for the women to use for their hair.

The bather would wait long enough for the perspiration to start, in order to guard against the danger of passing too suddenly into the high temperature of the next room.

See also

 Ancient Roman bathing

References

External links
 Greek and Roman baths at the Perseus Project

Ancient Roman baths
Rooms